The 2016 United States House of Representatives elections in Utah were held on November 8, 2016, to elect the four U.S. representatives from the state of Utah, one from each of the state's four congressional districts. The elections coincided with the 2016 U.S. presidential election, as well as other elections to the House of Representatives, elections to the United States Senate and various state and local elections. The primaries were held on June 28.

District 1 

The 1st District covers northern Utah, including the cities of Ogden and Logan. Incumbent congressman Rob Bishop was challenged by Democrat Peter Clemens. Bishop was re-elected with 65% of the vote.

General election

Results

District 2 

The 2nd District stretches from the Summit County, Utah line and goes west to the Nevada border and down through St. George. It includes parts of Davis, Salt Lake, Sanpete, and Juab Counties.

The current incumbent is Republican Chris Stewart who has represented the district since 2012. The district has a PVI of R+18.

Democratic candidate Charlene McArthur Albarran announced her intention to run on February 1, 2016, and formally filed with the Utah Elections office on March 11, 2016. She faced incumbent Republican Representative Chris Stewart, who was re-elected to his third term with 62% of the vote.

General election

Results

District 3

The 3rd district is located in southern and eastern Utah and includes the cities of Orem and Provo. The incumbent is Republican Jason Chaffetz, who has represented the district since 2009. He was re-elected with 72% of the vote in 2014 and the district has a PVI of R+28. Chaffetz won re-election in 2016 with 74% of the vote.

Republican primary

Results

General election

Results

District 4

The 4th district is located in northern-central Utah and includes parts of Salt Lake, Utah, Juab, and Sanpete Counties. The incumbent is Republican Mia Love, who has represented the district since 2015. She was elected with 50% of the vote in 2014 and the district has a PVI of R+16.

Democrat Doug Owens, who lost to Love in the 2014 election to succeed retiring Democratic Congressman Jim Matheson, ran in a rematch against Love. Love won re-election with 53% of the vote.

General election

Polling

Results

References

External links
U.S. House elections in Utah, 2016 at Ballotpedia
Campaign contributions at OpenSecrets

Utah
2016
House